Dominikonų Street (literally, "Dominican Street") is one of the oldest and central streets in the Vilnius Old Town, connecting Trakų Street and Šv. Jono Street.

Notable landmarks are situated in once one of the most ornate Vilnius' streets, including Dominican Church of the Holy Spirit, Sanctuary of the Divine Mercy and historical palaces of Lithuanian nobility.

Gallery

References

Streets in Vilnius